Spain national roller hockey team is the national team side of Spain at international roller hockey. It is one of the best teams of the world and has been dominating both the Rink Hockey World Championship and the Rink Hockey European Championship in the last decade.

The Spain national side is Catalonia based, since roller hockey is specially popular in that Spanish region, although it also has first-class teams in other regions, like Galicia and Asturias.

Squad

 Head coach: Alejandro Domínguez

Titles
 Roller Hockey World Cup (17): 1951, 1954, 1955, 1964, 1966, 1970, 1972, 1976, 1980, 1989, 2001, 2005, 2007, 2009, 2011, 2013, 2017
 European Roller Hockey Championship (18): 1951, 1954, 1955, 1957, 1969, 1979, 1981, 1983, 1985, 2000, 2002, 2004, 2006, 2008, 2010, 2012, 2018, 2021
 Nations Cup (17): 1952, 1953, 1957, 1959, 1960, 1975, 1976, 1978, 1980, 1991, 1995, 1999, 2000, 2001, 2003, 2005, 2007

Competitive record

World Championship

Source:

See also
 Spain women's national roller hockey team

References

External links

National Roller Hockey Team
Roller hockey
National roller hockey (quad) teams
European national roller hockey (quad) teams